Boubacar Haïnikoye Soumana (born 7 October 1998) is a Nigerien footballer who plays for CR Belouizdad and the Niger national team.

Club career
He spent time in Norway on trials with Kristiansund BK and Hamkam in 2018. In May 2018 Haïnikoye joined Ghanaian Champions Aduana Stars F.C. on a 2-year deal from US Gendamerie National. The following January the player moved to Algerian side CR Belouizdad, again on a two-year deal, in hopes of getting more playing time. The following year the player joined NC Magra of the Algerian Ligue Professionnelle 1. Haïnikoye was reportedly the target of racial abuse from the opposing team's officials during a league match against JS Saoura on 29 May 2021.

International career
Haïnikoye made his senior international debut on 13 August 2017 in a 2018 African Nations Championship qualification match against the Ivory Coast. He went on to score his first goal for the team in that game, a late winner in the 2–1 victory.

International goals
Scores and results list Niger's goal tally first.

International career statistics

References

External links

1998 births
Living people
Nigerien footballers
Niger international footballers
Association football forwards
People from Niamey
US GN players
Aduana Stars F.C. players
CR Belouizdad players
NC Magra players
Nigerien expatriate footballers
Expatriate footballers in Ghana
Nigerien expatriate sportspeople in Ghana
Expatriate footballers in Algeria
Nigerien expatriate sportspeople in Algeria
Ghana Premier League players
Algerian Ligue Professionnelle 1 players
Niger A' international footballers
2022 African Nations Championship players